Hillspring (Beck Farm) Aerodrome  is located  northeast of Hill Spring, Alberta, Canada.

References

Registered aerodromes in Alberta